Sekolah Indonesia Kuala Lumpur (SIKL) is an Indonesian international school in Kuala Lumpur. It goes up to SMA (senior high school/sixth form) level.

Notes

External links

 Sekolah Indonesia Kuala Lumpur 

International schools in Kuala Lumpur
Secondary schools in Kuala Lumpur
Indonesian international schools
Indonesia–Malaysia relations